National Park Highway may refer to the following:
National Park to Park Highway, an early route forming a loop to national parks in the western United States
U.S. Route 89 which follows parts of the historical route and sometimes referred to as National Park Highway
National Park Highway (Washington), a state highway in the area around Mount Rainier, Washington, U.S.
A highway in a National Park

See also
Lassen Volcanic National Park Highway Historic District, the main roadway within Lassen Volcanic National Park in northern California, U.S.